Kim Min-ho (born 25 January 2000) is a South Korean footballer currently playing as a goalkeeper for Nagano Parceiro, on loan from Sagan Tosu.

Career statistics

Club
.

Notes

References

External links

2000 births
Living people
Japanese footballers
Association football goalkeepers
J3 League players
Sagan Tosu players
AC Nagano Parceiro players
South Korean expatriate footballers
South Korean expatriate sportspeople in Japan
Expatriate footballers in Japan